John Frederick Cecil Jackson (8 May 1880 – 22 November 1968) was an English first-class cricketer who played a single match, for Worcestershire against Oxford University. He scored 0 and 6.

Jackson was born in Meopham, Kent; he died aged 88 in Kidderminster, Worcestershire.

External links
 

1880 births
1968 deaths
English cricketers
Worcestershire cricketers
People from Meopham